Moffat toffee is a boiled sweet made in the Scottish town of Moffat.

The confection is notable for its tangy but sweet centre which gives the sweet its unusual flavour.

The Moffat Toffee old family recipe is thought to have been used for the first time commercially by present owner Blair Blacklock’s great-grandmother, Janet Cook Johnstone, around the late 19th century. The toffee was made by hand in batches of about 7 lbs (3 kilos) at the time. It was sold mainly in uncut flat rounds of varying sizes. It is still made in Moffat and over 300 kilos are made of the  sweet every week.
Moffat Toffee can be found in many sweet shops, garden centres and other retail outlets in Scotland including the Moffat Toffee Shop.

References

Scottish confectionery
Scottish brands